Gliese 328, also known as BD+02 2098, is a M-type main-sequence star. Its surface temperature is 3989 K. Gliese 328 is depleted in heavy elements compared to the Sun, with a metallicity Fe/H index of −0.13. The age of the star is unknown. Gliese 328 exhibits an activity cycle similar to that of the Sun, with a period around 2000 d.

Multiplicity surveys did not detect any stellar companions as of 2016.

Planetary system
In 2013, one superjovian planet, named Gliese 328b, was discovered on a wide, highly eccentric orbit by the radial velocity method. The known planetary orbit is wide enough to not disrupt orbits of other bodies in the habitable zone of the star.

References

Hydra (constellation)
M-type main-sequence stars
Planetary systems with one confirmed planet
J08550761+0132472
BD+02 2098
043790
0328